SS Gallois was one of seven merchant vessels which became stranded and then wrecked on Haisbro Sands of the Norfolk coast on 6 August 1941 during the Second World War. The SS Gallois had been part of a convoy with the designation Convoy FS 559.

History
The Gallois was a steam merchant ship built in 1917 by Wood, Skinner & Company Ltd., Newcastle upon Tyne, England. Her yard number was No:197. She had been ordered by the Burnett Steam Ship Co. Ltd., (Burnett & Co) of Newcastle upon Tyne. Her original name was the SS Tynemouth. In 1929 she was sold to Tredegar Associated Collieries & Shipping Co. Ltd (A Capel & Co., Ltd.) of Cardiff, Wales. This company renamed her SS Lord Aberconway. In 1930 she was again sold to Etablissenents Oden de Lubersac of Rouen, France, who renamed her SS Gallois. The ship was requisitioned in London in July 1940 by the British Government during the Second World War.

Final voyage
On 5 August 1941 Convoy FS 559 was proceeding down the East coast of Britain to London from Newcastle. The convoy was being escorted by two Royal Navy destroyers of the Rosyth escort-force.  was a V-class destroyer built in 1917, whilst  was of the Thorneycroft W class built a year later in 1918. Also helping with the escort duties were two trawlers,  and HMT Arkwright. The night was drawing in as the convoy made its way down the coast and the weather was poor. There was a north-north west gale in full blow with rain. It was cold and visibility was poor. By the early hours and daylight of 6 August the convoy was enveloped in a thick sea mist making visibility very poor.

Disaster
There are two accounts of what happened in the early hours of 6 August 1941. The first is that when Convoy FS 559 was being passed by a northbound convoy. They had come under attack by German E-boats. The standing instruction for ships in convoy under these circumstances was to scatter in groups, each with their own Royal Navy escort. HMT Agate led her group away and had either lost all notion of her position or the channel buoys had moved. The convoy had been unable to see the Haisborough Light in the poor visibility which due to wartime restrictions was only illuminated for ten minutes when a convoy was due in the area. This had caused the lead escort difficulty in plotting their position. Soon seven of the vessels were stranded on the sands. The second version and the more likely cause of the ships running aground is that the bad weather conditions, and the strong westerly drift, and the fact that the exact position of the convoy was unavailable; the ships involved just ran aground.

Rescue
The Cromer lifeboat had been alerted to the unfolding disaster out on Haisbro Sands at 8:00 am on 6 August. The Cromer Number 1 boat H F Bailey put out at once with Coxswain Henry Blogg in command. The lifeboat arrived at Haisborough Sands at 9:40 am. Above the lifeboat, the crew of H F Bailey could hear the slow drone of RAF aircraft sent to patrol above the stricken convoy. As the lifeboat approached the sands, Blogg and his crew saw the seven big cargo vessels stranded with their backs broken. All that was visible was the ships' bridges as the sea broke across their decks. One of the escort destroyers had already begun rescue work using one of her whaler boats. The sea conditions the whaler came up against resulted in twelve of the seaman drowning by the time the lifeboat arrived.
Before attending to the Gallois, the lifeboat took 16 men to safety from the SS Oxshott. Coxswain Blogg then took the H F Bailey alongside the Gallois. The steamer was still just above water and her engines were still running. Blogg held the lifeboat alongside the ship, head to the wind, while some of the crew jumped aboard and others slid down ropes. One of the crew fell into the sea but was hauled out by one of the lifeboat men, unharmed. In total the H F Bailey rescued 31 men from the SS Gallois which with the crew from the Oxshott meant she was now carrying 47 rescued seamen. The lifeboat left the sands and transferred the rescued men to a nearby destroyer. The H F Bailey then returned to the sands, her work not yet completed.

Awards
Coxswain Henry Blogg and his crew were recognised for their bravery on the service to Convoy FS559 at an award ceremony held at the Regal Cinema in Hans Place, Cromer. The ceremony was attended by Vice Admiral Sir John Cunningham and a large audience. Ironically the proceedings were interrupted by the lifeboat being called out to service. After a short while it was announced that the call-out had been cancelled and the ceremony continued. Henry Blogg received a second bar to his RNLI Gold Medal and was also awarded the British Empire Medal. Jack Davis was awarded the RNLI silver medal, as did coxswain Charles Johnson of the Great Yarmouth and Gorleston lifeboat. Several other members of the Cromer crew were awarded RNLI bronze medals.

Position of the wreck of the SS Gallois today

 North of Hemsby East-north east of North Walsham North of Caister on Sea  East of Cromer

Cromer Lifeboat Crew

References

External links
The Cromer Lifeboat
Cromer Lifeboat Station
The Old Cromer Lifeboat Shed

Shipwrecks of Norfolk
Steamships
Merchant ships of the United Kingdom
Shipwrecks in the North Sea
Maritime incidents in August 1941
1916 ships
Ships built on the River Tyne